Abu ’l-Maḥāsin Ṣafī al-Dīn Abd al-Aziz ibn Saraya al-Ḥillī al-Ṭāyyʾī al-Sinbisī (26 August 1278 – 1349 AD/5 Rabi' al-Thani 677 – 749 AH), more commonly known as Ṣafī al-Dīn al-Ḥillī or Ṣafiddīn al-Ḥilli, was a 14th-century Arab warrior poet.

Life 
Despite his being one of the most famous poets of his century, the historical record of Al-Hilli's life is often vague. Al-Hilli's birth is recorded as 26 August 1278 in most sources, though one of his contemporaries gives his birth as October or November 1279. He was born in Hillah, modern-day Iraq, to a Shia Muslim family of the renowned Tayyi tribe. Early in life, after one of his uncles was murdered, Al-Hilli fought in a battle to avenge his death. He wrote poems about his family's exploits in this battle, which garnered a lot of attention.

After he achieved his initial success as a poet, a war broke out, having to leave his wives and his family behind, he was forced to leave Iraq in 1302. Around this time, he became the court poet in Mardin, modern-day Turkey, under the Artuqids. In his youth he made money mostly through commerce, later in life he made a living by writing eulogies for wealthy princes. 

Al-Hilli died in 1338 or 1349.

Poetry 

Al-Hilli, alongside Ibn Nubata, was one of the two most celebrated Arab poets of the 14th century. Al-Hilli's poetic style was considered innovative and experimental, integrating established poetic traditions with new vocabulary.

Al-Hilli is perhaps best remembered for the poetic lines which inspired the Pan-Arab colors: "White are our deeds, black are our battles, / Green are our tents, red are our swords." These lines are from Al-Hilli's fakhr ("boasting") poem written to celebrate his family's victories in the battle to avenge his uncle.

His major poetic works are a collection of eulogies titled Durar al-Nuhur ("Jewels for Necks") and his Diwan ("Poems"). In his Diwan, he organizes his poems into twelve categories spanning most major Arabic thematic genres: 

 Boasting and bravery (Fakhr)
 Eulogy, praise and thanksgiving (Madih)
 Hunting poems and others (Tardiyyah)
 Friendship (Khawal)
 Ritha and condolence
 Ghazal and other erotic themes
 Wine and flower poetry (Khamriyyah)
 Lamentations and chiding
 Apologies, gifts and pleads for leniency
 Philosophy and riddles
 Adab, asceticism and religion
 Satire and funny anecdotes.

Al-Hillī is also noted for composing one of four collections of epigrammatic maqṭūʿ-poems that were seminal for the development of the genre in the fourteenth century: his twenty-chapter Dīwān al-Mathālith wa-l-mathānī fī l-maʿālī wa-l-maʿānī ('The Collection of Two-liners and Three-liners on Virtues and Literary Motifs'). This was composed between 1331 and 1341 at the princely court in Hama, and dedicated to al-Malik al-Afḍal (r. 1332–41). In addition to writing poetry, he wrote several works of literary criticism on poetic forms.

External links 

 Poetry Collection of Ṣafī al-Dīn al-Ḥilli (in Arabic) at World Digital Library.

References 

1278 births
1349 deaths
13th-century Arabs
14th-century Arabs
Place of death unknown
Iraqi writers
Arabic-language poets
People from Hillah